Washington Irving High School at 18 North Broadway in Tarrytown, New York was built c. 1897. In the 1920s, the new building was constructed for the school about a half mile south on Broadway, and the old school later become the Frank R. Pierson School.  After the school closed, the building was derelict for many years, until being converted to condominiums.

The site of the school is considered to be one possibility – of many – for the location of the Elizabeth Van Tassel house, a Revolutionary War-era tavern mentioned by Washington Irving in "The Legend of Sleepy Hollow".

The building was entered on the National Register of Historic Places on April 26, 1984.

See also
National Register of Historic Places listings in northern Westchester County, New York

References

Schools in Westchester County, New York
Tarrytown, New York
National Register of Historic Places in Westchester County, New York
Defunct schools in New York (state)